The Men's giant slalom competition of the Lake Placid 1980 Olympics was held at Whiteface Mountain.

The defending world champion was Ingemar Stenmark of Sweden, who was also the defending World Cup giant slalom champion and led the 1980 World Cup.

Results

References 

Men's giant slalom
Winter Olympics